John Murphy (born 1886) was an Irish professional footballer who played as an inside forward. He earned three caps for Ireland in 1910.

Career
Murphy joined Bradford City from Shelbourne in May 1909. He made 6 league appearances for the club. He left the club in August 1912 to join Luton Town. Murphy made 11 appearances and scored 2 goals during his time at Luton, all of these coming in the league during the 1912–13 season. He later played for Shamrock Rovers.

Career statistics

Sources

References

External links

1886 births
20th-century deaths
Year of death missing
Date of death missing
Association footballers from Dublin (city)
Irish association footballers (before 1923)
Pre-1950 IFA international footballers
Irish League representative players
Shelbourne F.C. players
Bradford City A.F.C. players
Luton Town F.C. players
Shamrock Rovers F.C. players
English Football League players
Southern Football League players
Association football inside forwards